Roccaforzata is a town and comune in the province of Taranto, Apulia, southeastern Italy. Roccaforzata was historically an  Arbëreshë settlement. After the inhabitants abandoned the Albanian Greek Orthodox faith they assimilated into the local population.

Notable People
Gjergj Basta, 16th century Albanian Arbëreshë Stratiot.

References

Cities and towns in Apulia
Localities of Salento
Arbëresh settlements